The Dr. George E. Hill House is an historic house located at 870 Indianola Drive in Indianola on Merritt Island, Florida. On March 3, 1994, it was added to the U.S. National Register of Historic Places.

External links
 Brevard County listings at National Register of Historic Places
 Brevard County listings at Florida's Office of Cultural and Historical Programs

Houses in Brevard County, Florida
National Register of Historic Places in Brevard County, Florida
Buildings and structures in Merritt Island, Florida